Francisco Galván is a Mexican former tennis player.

Galván won two bronze medals for Mexico in doubles at the 1946 Central American and Caribbean Games.

In 1948 he featured in the main draw of the U.S. National Championships, where he was beaten in the second round by Herbert Flam, following a first round bye.

References

External links
 

Year of birth missing (living people)
Living people
Mexican male tennis players
Competitors at the 1946 Central American and Caribbean Games
Central American and Caribbean Games bronze medalists for Mexico
Central American and Caribbean Games medalists in tennis